Anthony Rous (1605 – 1 May 1677) was an English politician who sat in the House of Commons  at various times between 1653 and 1660. He was an officer in the Parliamentary army in the English Civil War.

Rous was the son of Robert Rous and his wife Jane Pym, daughter of Alexander Pym and niece of John Pym.

In 1653, Rous was elected Member of Parliament for Cornwall in the Barebones Parliament. He was re-elected MP for Cornwall in the First Protectorate Parliament and in the Second Protectorate Parliament.

In April 1660, Rous was elected Member of Parliament for Helston for the Convention Parliament in a double return. He was seated in May 1660, but the election was declared void on 27 June and a by-election was held. 
 
Rous married Mary Bradshaw, daughter of William Bradshaw of Lancashire and had a son Francis.

References

1605 births
1677 deaths
Members of the pre-1707 English Parliament for constituencies in Cornwall
Roundheads
Place of birth missing
Masters of the Jewel Office